Meranti Islands is a regency (kabupaten) of Riau Province, and lies off the eastern coast of the island of Sumatra, Indonesia. The regency comprises the islands of Tebing Tinggi, Rangsang, Padang and Merbau, together with minor offshore islands. The principal town is Selat Panjang on Tebing Tinggi Island. The regency covers an area of 3,707.84 km2, and had a population of 176,290 at the 2010 Census, 180,946 at the 2015 Census and 206,116 at the 2020 Census.

Administrative districts
When created, the regency was divided into five districts (kecamatan), listed below with their populations at the 2010 Census:

On 26 January 2011 the regency was re-divided into nine districts. The additional four districts are Tebing Tinggi Timur (East Tebing Tingggi Island, leaving the residual area of Tebing Tinggi District to cover the town of Selat Panjang), Rangsang Pesisir (Coastal Rangsang), Pulau Merbau (Merbau Island, leaving the residual area of Merbau District to cover the southern part of Padang Island) and Tasik Putri Puyu (covering the northern part of Padang Island). The areas and the populations at the 2020 Census of the nine districts have areas as follows. The table also includes the locations of the district administrative centres, and the number of villages (rural desa and urban kelurahan) in each district.

References

Regencies of Riau